Richard Muir (born 18 June 1943) is a British landscape archaeologist and author living outside Harrogate, Yorkshire.

Education
Muir was awarded his first degree and his doctorate by the University of Aberdeen where he is now an Honorary Research Fellow. He has been a lecturer in geography at several British and Irish universities.

Publications
He has been widely published for over 30 years on landscape history. He founded and initially edited the journal Landscapes.
His works include:

 Modern Political Geography (1975)
 The English Village (1980)
 The Lost Villages of Britain (1982)
 History From The Air (1983)
 The National Trust Guide to Prehistoric and Roman Britain (with H Welfare, 1983)
 The Yorkshire Countryside: A Landscape History (1997)
 Landscape Encyclopaedia (2004)

References

1943 births
Living people
British archaeologists